The Downton Castle Sandstone is a geologic formation in England. It preserves fossils dating back to the Silurian period. As its name would suggest the formation predominantly consists of sandstone with minor siltstone and mudstone. The oldest known Trigonotarbid Palaeotarbus is known from the formation.

See also

 Grey Downtonian
 List of fossiliferous stratigraphic units in England

References

 

Geologic formations of England
Silurian System of Europe
Silurian England
Sandstone formations
Silurian southern paleotemperate deposits